Ettori is a surname. Notable people with the surname include:

Jean-Luc Ettori (born 1955), French footballer
Magà Ettori (born 1972), Corsican filmmaker living in Dublin

See also
 Ettore

Italian-language surnames
Patronymic surnames
Surnames from given names